"Blame It on Me" is a song by Northern Irish musical group D:Ream, released in August 1994 as the sixth and last single from their debut album, D-Ream On Volume 1 (1993). It is written by frontman Peter Cunnah and features backing vocals by Jamie Petrie and Linda Duggan. Produced by Tom Frederikse, it peaked at number 25 on the UK Singles Chart and number 15 on the UK Dance Singles Chart.

Critical reception
In his weekly UK chart commentary, James Masterton wrote, "The new single clams things down a little from the rampant dance pop of their previous hits with an almost gospelly [that's not even a word] ballad which may well under-perform in the charts, despite being another example of a song well sung." Pan-European magazine Music & Media commented, "While George Michael spends all his time in court, Peter Cunnah takes his chance to fill the gap in the market. Here he's like a young Joel singing the "River of D:Reams"." 

Alan Jones from Music Week gave it four out of five and named it Pick of the Week, saying, "Quite different from previous D:Ream singles, this mid-tempoed pop nugget is dominated by piano and soft percussion, which allow Peter Cunnah to weave in and out with rather more room for expression than some of the group's other material." James Hamilton from the RM Dance Update described it as a "pop crooner Peter Cunnah's huge singalong chroused and piano plonked shuffling jiggly 0-97.8-0bpm [track]". Darren Ressler from Vibe complimented it as a "tender, gospel-tinged pop ballad".

Music video
A music video was produced to promote the single. It was later published by Vevo on YouTube in November 2018.

Track listing
 7-inch single, UK (1994)
 "Blame It on Me"	
 "Heart of Gold"

 12-inch, UK (1994)
 "Blame It on Me" (A Club Dub By Tin Tin Out)
 "Blame It on Me" (original version)
 "Blame It on Me" (The Herbal mix)

 CD single, UK (1994)
 "Blame It on Me" – 3:47
 "Heart of Gold" – 3:43
 "U R the Best Thing" (acoustic) – 4:16
 "Blame It on Me" (A Club Dub by Tin Tin Out) – 8:06

Charts

References

 

1994 singles
1994 songs
D Ream songs
Magnet Records singles
Pop ballads
Songs written by Peter Cunnah